Bala Gau Kashi Angai is a Marathi movie released on 4 April 1977. Alka loses her mind when her baby dies after Madhuri accidentally drops him. Feeling guilty, Madhuri marries Sridhar with the intention of giving her baby to Alka, which may help her recover.
 The movie has been produced by M.S.Salvi and directed by Kamlakar Torne.

Synopsis 

Madhuri, a resident in Pune is the daughter of a retired Forest Officer and lives with her brother and parents. Her father's friend's son, Vasant is staying with them till he completes his higher studies. Vasant & Madhuri are childhood friends and she is in love with Vasant, but he loves Alka, a girl from his college. One day, Vasant leaves urgently to meet his ailing father in Belgaum and returns with Alka, now his wife. Alka gives birth to a son and the boy is more attached to Madhuri, who also tends to shower him with motherly affection. One day, the baby accidentally slips from Madhuri's hands and dies. As a result Alka goes mad with shock. Madhuri in turn, gets married to Shridhar in order to bear a child and offer it to Alka with the hope of her recovery.

Cast 

 Asha Kale as Madhuri
 Vikram Gokhale as Vasant
Nayantara as Alka
 Satish Dubhashi as Shridhar
 Madhukar Toradmal as Madhuri's father
 Vatsala Deshmukh as Madhuri's mother
 Raja Bapat
 Sarswati Bodas
 Datta Bhatt
 Ramesh Salgaonkar
 Shantaram Desai
 Jaywant Pawar
 Shantabai Sathe

Soundtrack
The music has been directed by N. Dutta and all lyrics were written by Jagdish Khebudkar.

Track listing
"Dhundit Gau Mastit Rahu" (Lyricist(s): Madhusudan Kelkar, Jagdish Khebudkar) - Mahendra Kapoor, Asha Bhosle
"Nimbonichya Jhadamage" - Suman Kalyanpur
"Halke Halke Jojawa" - Usha Mangeshkar
"Are Man Mohana" - Asha Bhosle
"Sansar Mandate Mi" - Asha Bhosle

References

External links 

 Album - dhingana.com

1977 films
1970s Marathi-language films
Films scored by Datta Naik